Hunter Woodhall (born on February 17, 1999) is an American track and field athlete. He won a bronze medal in the Men's 400m T62 at the 2020 Summer Paralympics. On 16 October 2022, Woodhall married his longtime girlfriend, Olympian Tara Woodhall.

He made his international debut in 2015 with a silver and bronze medal at the 2015 IPC Athletics World Championships, and later won a bronze and silver medal at the 2016 Summer Paralympics. After graduating from Syracuse High School, he became the first double amputee to earn an NCAA Division I scholarship.

Early life
Woodhall was born in Georgia while his father was serving in the military. Woodhall's parents decided to amputate both his legs at 11 months old due to fibular hemimelia. Raised in Syracuse, Utah, he was homeschooled until fifth grade and upon entering public school he was bullied for his disability. Although he was originally given prosthetic legs, Woodhall switched to carbon fiber "blades" for running and joined a track team.

Career
While attending Syracuse High School, Woodhall competed with the United States National Paralympic Team in international competitions. He made his international debut in 2015 with a silver and bronze medal at the 2015 IPC Athletics World Championships.

By his senior year, Woodhall was ranked 20th across America in the 400m run with a time of 47.32 seconds. He competed in the 2016 Summer Paralympics where he won a bronze medal in the men's 400 meter and a silver medal in the men's 200-meter. As a result, Syracuse City’s Mayor, Terry Palmer deemed September 15 “Hunter Woodhall Day.” By the conclusion of his high school education, Woodhall was named 2016 Male High School Track Athlete of the Year. Upon graduating, Woodhall became the first double-amputee track and field athlete to earn a Division I athletic scholarship, which he accepted at the University of Arkansas.

In his freshman year at the University of Arkansas, Woodhall competed in the SEC division alongside able-bodied runners. He competed in six indoor meets, running 1:58.04 over 800 meters, and seven outdoor meets, running 47.42 over 400 meters. His times earned him a bronze medal in the 4x400 at the SEC Outdoor Championships. By the conclusion of the season, he was nominated for NCAA Game Changer of the Year and named a First-Team All-America in the 4x400 Relay and Distance Medley Relay. During his sophomore and junior years, Woodhall ran a lifetime-best 46.22 seconds in the 400-meter at the SEC outdoor championships and became a three-time All-American in the 4x400-meter. While in his junior year, Woodhall joined the video sharing app TikTok where he shared the story of how he lost his legs. As a result, he was invited to The Ellen DeGeneres Show where he was given $20,000 to help him with his 2020 Paralympic goals.

References

External links 
 Paralympic profile
 Team USA profile

Living people
1999 births
Medalists at the 2016 Summer Paralympics
Medalists at the 2020 Summer Paralympics
Paralympic silver medalists for the United States
Track and field athletes from Utah
Paralympic bronze medalists for the United States
American male sprinters
Athletes (track and field) at the 2016 Summer Paralympics
Arkansas Razorbacks men's track and field athletes
American amputees
Paralympic medalists in athletics (track and field)
Paralympic track and field athletes of the United States
Athletes (track and field) at the 2020 Summer Paralympics
People from Syracuse, Utah